The 2021–22 Carolina Hurricanes season was the 43rd season for the National Hockey League (NHL) franchise that was established in June 1979, and 24th season since the franchise relocated from the Hartford Whalers to start the 1997–98 NHL season. On April 9, 2022, the Hurricanes clinched a playoff berth after a 5–3 win against the Buffalo Sabres.

In the playoffs, the Hurricanes defeated the Boston Bruins in the first round in seven games but they were upset in the Second Round by the New York Rangers, losing in seven games.

Standings

Divisional standings

Conference standings

Schedule and results

Preseason

|- style="background:#cfc;"
| 1 || September 28 || Tampa Bay Lightning || 3–1 || || Andersen  || PNC Arena || 8,136 || 1–0–0 || 
|- style="background:#fcc;"
| 2 || October 1 || @ Tampa Bay Lightning || 5–8 || || Raanta || Amalie Arena || 12,509 || 1–1–0 || 
|- style="background:#ffc;"
| 3 || October 5 || Nashville Predators || 2–3 || OT || Raanta || PNC Arena || 7,011 || 1–1–1 || 
|- style="background:#fcc;"
| 4 || October 9 || @ Nashville Predators || 3–4 || || Andersen || Bridgestone Arena || 15,095 || 1–2–1 || 
|-

Regular season

|- style="background:#cfc;"
| 1 || October 14 || New York Islanders || 6–3 || || Andersen || PNC Arena || 18,680 || 1–0–0 || 2 || 
|- style="background:#cfc;"
| 2 || October 16 || @ Nashville Predators || 3–2 || || Andersen || Bridgestone Arena || 17,162 || 2–0–0 || 4 || 
|- style="background:#cfc;"
| 3 || October 21 || @ Montreal Canadiens || 4–1 || || Andersen || Bell Centre || 19,174 || 3–0–0 || 6 || 
|- style="background:#cfc;"
| 4 || October 23 || @ Columbus Blue Jackets || 5–1 || || Andersen || Nationwide Arena || 14,386 || 4–0–0 ||8 || 
|- style="background:#cfc;"
| 5 || October 25 || Toronto Maple Leafs || 4–1 || || Andersen || PNC Arena || 14,011 || 5–0–0 || 10 || 
|- style="background:#cfc;"
| 6 || October 28 || Boston Bruins || 3–0 || || Andersen || PNC Arena || 16,093 || 6–0–0 || 12 || 
|- style="background:#cfc;"
| 7 || October 29 || Chicago Blackhawks || 6–3 || || Raanta || PNC Arena || 16,434 || 7–0–0 || 14 || 
|- style="background:#cfc;"
| 8 || October 31 || Arizona Coyotes || 2–1 || || Andersen || PNC Arena || 14,343 || 8–0–0 || 16 || 
|-

|- style="background:#cfc;"
| 9 || November 3 || @ Chicago Blackhawks || 4–3 || || Andersen || United Center || 16,449 || 9–0–0 || 18 || 
|- style="background:#fcc;"
| 10 || November 6 || @ Florida Panthers || 2–5 || || Andersen || FLA Live Arena || 13,835 || 9–1–0 || 18 || 
|- style="background:#cfc;"
| 11 || November 9 || @ Tampa Bay Lightning || 2–1 || OT || Andersen || Amalie Arena || 19,092 || 10–1–0 || 20 || 
|- style="background:#fcc;"
| 12 || November 12 || Philadelphia Flyers || 1–2 || || Andersen || PNC Arena || 18,680 || 10–2–0 || 20 || 
|- style="background:#cfc;"
| 13 || November 13 || St. Louis Blues || 3–2 || || Lyon || PNC Arena || 18,680 || 11–2–0 || 22 || 
|- style="background:#cfc;"
| 14 || November 16 || @ Vegas Golden Knights || 4–2 || || Raanta || T-Mobile Arena || 17,737 || 12–2–0 || 24 || 
|- style="background:#cfc;"
| 15 || November 18 || @ Anaheim Ducks || 2–1 || || Andersen || Honda Center || 12,379 || 13–2–0 || 26 || 
|- style="background:#cfc;"
| 16 || November 20 || @ Los Angeles Kings || 5–4 ||  || Andersen || Staples Center || 15,744 || 14–2–0 || 28 || 
|- style="background:#ffc;"
| 17 || November 22 || @ San Jose Sharks || 1–2 || OT || Raanta || SAP Center || 10,970 || 14–2–1 || 29 || 
|- style="background:#fcc;"
| 18 || November 24 || @ Seattle Kraken || 1–2 || || Andersen || Climate Pledge Arena || 17,151 || 14–3–1 || 29 || 
|- style="background:#cfc;"
| 19 || November 26 || @ Philadelphia Flyers || 6–3 ||  || Raanta || Wells Fargo Center || 18,959 || 15–3–1 || 31 || 
|- style="background:#fcc;"
| 20 || November 28 || Washington Capitals || 2–4 || || Andersen || PNC Arena || 18,815 || 15–4–1 || 31 ||  
|- style="background:#fcc;"
| 21 || November 30 || @ Dallas Stars || 1–4 || || Andersen || American Airlines Center || 17,345 || 15–5–1 || 31 || 
|-

|- style="background:#fcc;"
| 22 || December 2 || Ottawa Senators || 2–3 || || Raanta || PNC Arena || 14,915 || 15–6–1 || 31 || 
|- style="background:#cfc;"
| 23 || December 4 || Buffalo Sabres || 6–2 || || Raanta || PNC Arena || 18,680 || 16–6–1 || 33 || 
|- style="background:#cfc;"
| 24 || December 7 || @ Winnipeg Jets || 4–2 || || Andersen || Canada Life Centre || 13,761 || 17–6–1 || 35 || 
|- style="background:#cfc;"
| 25 || December 9 || @ Calgary Flames || 2–1 || OT || Andersen || Scotiabank Saddledome || 15,620 || 18–6–1 || 37 || 
|- style="background:#cfc;"
| 26 || December 11 || @ Edmonton Oilers || 3–1 || || Andersen || Rogers Place || 18,025 || 19–6–1 || 39 || 
|- style="background:#fcc;"
| 27 || December 12 || @ Vancouver Canucks || 1–2 || || Raanta || Rogers Arena || 18,714 || 19–7–1 || 39 || 
|- style="background:#ccc;"
| — || December 14 || @ Minnesota Wild || colspan="8"|Postponed due to COVID-19. Moved to February 12.
|- style="background:#cfc;"
| 28 || December 16 || Detroit Red Wings || 5–3 || || Andersen || PNC Arena || 16,017 || 20–7–1 || 41 || 
|- style="background:#cfc"
| 29 || December 18 || Los Angeles Kings || 5–1 || || Andersen || PNC Arena || 16,238 || 21–7–1 || 43 || 
|- style="background:#ccc;"
| — || December 19 || Nashville Predators || colspan="8"|Postponed due to COVID-19. Moved to February 18.
|- style="background:#ccc;"
| — || December 21 || @ Boston Bruins || colspan="8"|Postponed due to COVID-19. Moved to February 10.
|- style="background:#ccc;"
| — || December 23 || @ Ottawa Senators || colspan="8"|Postponed due to COVID-19. Moved to February 8.
|- style="background:#ccc;"
| — || December 27 || Florida Panthers || colspan="8"|Postponed due to COVID-19. Moved to February 16.
|- style="background:#cfc;"
| 30 || December 30 || Montreal Canadiens || 4–0 || || Raanta || PNC Arena || 17,722 || 22–7–1 || 45 || 
|-

|- style="background:#cfc;"
| 31 || January 1 || @ Columbus Blue Jackets || 7–4 ||  || Andersen || Nationwide Arena || 15,736 || 23–7–1 || 47 || 
|- style="background:#ccc;"
| — || January 3 || @ Toronto Maple Leafs || colspan="8"|Postponed due to attendance restrictions. Moved to February 7.
|- style="background:#cfc;"
| 32 || January 7 || Calgary Flames || 6–3 ||  || Andersen || PNC Arena || 16,281 || 24–7–1 || 49 || 
|- style="background:#ffc;"
| 33 || January 8 || Florida Panthers || 3–4 || OT || Lyon || PNC Arena || 18,680 || 24–7–2 || 50 || 
|- style="background:#ccc;"
| — || January 11 || @ Philadelphia Flyers || colspan="8"|Postponed due to COVID-19. Moved to February 21.
|- style="background:#fcc;"
| 34 || January 13 || Columbus Blue Jackets || 0–6 ||  || Andersen || PNC Arena || 15,979 || 24–8–2 || 50 || 
|- style="background:#cfc;"
| 35 || January 15 || Vancouver Canucks || 4–1 ||  || Andersen || PNC Arena || 17,435 || 25–8–2 || 52 || 
|- style="background:#cfc;"
| 36 || January 18 || @ Boston Bruins || 7–1 ||  || Andersen || TD Garden || 17,850 || 26–8–2 || 54 || 
|- style="background:#cfc;"
| 37 || January 21 || New York Rangers || 6–3 ||  || Andersen || PNC Arena || 16,118 || 27–8–2 || 56 || 
|- style="background:#fcc;"
| 38 || January 22 || @ New Jersey Devils || 4–7 ||  || LaFontaine || Prudential Center || 13,657 || 27–9–2 || 56 || 
|- style="background:#cfc;"
| 39 || January 25 || Vegas Golden Knights || 4–3 || OT || Andersen || PNC Arena || 15,228 || 28–9–2 || 58 || 
|- style="background:#cfc;"
| 40 || January 27 || @ Ottawa Senators || 3–2 || SO || Andersen || Canadian Tire Centre || 0 || 29–9–2 || 60 || 
|- style="background:#cfc;"
| 41 || January 29 || New Jersey Devils || 2–1 ||  || Raanta || PNC Arena || 18,956 || 30–9–2 || 62 || 
|- style="background:#cfc;"
| 42 || January 30 || San Jose Sharks || 2–1 || || Andersen || PNC Arena || 15,975 || 31–9–2 || 64 || 

|- style="background:#ffc;"
| 43 || February 7 || @ Toronto Maple Leafs || 3–4 || OT || Andersen || Scotiabank Arena || 500 || 31–9–3 || 65 || 
|- style="background:#fcc;"
| 44 || February 8 || @ Ottawa Senators || 3–4 ||  || Raanta || Canadian Tire Centre || 500 || 31–10–3 || 65 || 
|- style="background:#cfc;"
| 45 || February 10 || @ Boston Bruins || 6–0 ||  || Andersen || TD Garden || 17,850 || 32–10–3 || 67 || 
|- style="background:#fcc;"
| 46 || February 12 || @ Minnesota Wild || 2–3 ||  || Andersen || Xcel Energy Center || 18,802 || 32–11–3 || 67 || 
|- style="background:#ffc;"
| 47 || February 16 || Florida Panthers || 2–3 || OT || Andersen || PNC Arena || 16,986 || 32–11–4 || 68 || 
|- style="background:#cfc;"
| 48 || February 18 || Nashville Predators || 5–3 ||  || Andersen || PNC Arena || 18,911 || 33–11–4 || 70 || 
|- style="background:#cfc;"
| 49 || February 20 || @ Pittsburgh Penguins || 4–3 ||  || Raanta || PPG Paints Arena || 18,429 || 34–11–4 || 72 || 
|- style="background:#cfc;"
| 50 || February 21 || @ Philadelphia Flyers || 4–3 || OT || Andersen || Wells Fargo Center || 14,591 || 35–11–4 || 74 || 
|- style="background:#cfc;"
| 51 || February 25 || Columbus Blue Jackets || 4–0 ||  || Andersen || PNC Arena || 17,112 || 36–11–4 || 76 || 
|- style="background:#cfc;"
| 52 || February 27 || Edmonton Oilers || 2–1 ||  || Andersen || PNC Arena || 18,801 || 37–11–4 || 78 || 
|-

|- style="background:#ffc;"
| 53 || March 1 || @ Detroit Red Wings || 3–4 || OT || Raanta || Little Caesars Arena || 14,874 || 37–11–5 || 79 || 
|- style="background:#fcc;"
| 54 || March 3 || @ Washington Capitals || 0–4 ||  || Andersen || Capital One Arena || 18,573 || 37–12–5 || 79 || 
|- style="background:#cfc;"
| 55 || March 4 || Pittsburgh Penguins || 3–2 || OT || Raanta || PNC Arena || 19,023 || 38–12–5 || 81 || 
|- style="background:#cfc;"
| 56 || March 6 || Seattle Kraken || 3–2 ||  || Raanta || PNC Arena || 18,156 || 39–12–5 || 83 || 
|- style="background:#cfc;"
| 57 || March 10 || Colorado Avalanche || 2–0 ||  || Raanta || PNC Arena || 18,056 || 40–12–5 || 85 || 
|- style="background:#cfc;"
| 58 || March 12 || Philadelphia Flyers || 3–1 ||  || Andersen || PNC Arena || 18,680 || 41–12–5 || 87 || 
|- style="background:#fcc;"
| 59 || March 13 || @ Pittsburgh Penguins || 2–4 ||  || Raanta || PPG Paints Arena || 17,866 || 41–13–5 || 87 || 
|- style="background:#fcc;"
| 60 || March 17 || @ Toronto Maple Leafs || 2–3 ||  || Andersen || Scotiabank Arena || 18,134 || 41–14–5 || 87 || 
|- style="background:#ffc;"
| 61 || March 18 || Washington Capitals || 3–4 || SO || Raanta || PNC Arena || 18,680 || 41–14–6 || 88 || 
|- style="background:#fcc;"
| 62 || March 20 || New York Rangers || 0–2 ||  || Andersen || PNC Arena || 18,680 || 41–15–6 || 88 || 
|- style="background:#cfc;"
| 63 || March 22 || Tampa Bay Lightning || 3–2 ||  || Andersen || PNC Arena || 16,783 || 42–15–6 || 90 || 
|- style="background:#ffc;"
| 64 || March 24 || Dallas Stars || 3–4 || SO || Andersen || PNC Arena || 16,421 || 42–15–7 || 91 || 
|- style="background:#cfc;"
| 65 || March 26 || @ St. Louis Blues || 7–2 ||  || Raanta || Enterprise Center || 18,096 || 43–15–7 || 93 || 
|- style="background:#cfc;"
| 66 || March 28 || @ Washington Capitals || 6–1 ||  || Andersen || Capital One Arena || 18,573 || 44–15–7 || 95 || 
|- style="background:#ffc;"
| 67 || March 29 || @ Tampa Bay Lightning || 3–4 || OT || Raanta || Amalie Arena || 19,092 || 44–15–8 || 96 || 
|- style="background:#cfc;"
| 68 || March 31 || Montreal Canadiens || 4–0 ||  || Andersen || PNC Arena || 15,289 || 45–15–8 || 98 || 
|-

|- style="background:#fcc;"
| 69 || April 2 || Minnesota Wild || 1–3 || || Andersen || PNC Arena || 16,375 || 45–16–8 || 98 || 
|- style="background:#fcc;"
| 70 || April 5 || @ Buffalo Sabres || 2–4 ||  || Andersen || KeyBank Center || 8,984 || 45–17–8 || 98 || 
|- style="background:#cfc;"
| 71 || April 7 || Buffalo Sabres || 5–3 ||  || Andersen || PNC Arena || 15,639 || 46–17–8 || 100 || 
|- style="background:#fcc;"
| 72 || April 8 || New York Islanders || 1–2 ||  || Andersen || PNC Arena || 17,279 || 46–18–8 || 100 || 
|- style="background:#cfc;"
| 73 || April 10 || Anaheim Ducks || 5–2 ||  || Andersen || PNC Arena || 17,342 || 47–18–8 || 102 || 
|- style="background:#cfc;"
| 74 || April 12 || @ New York Rangers || 4–2 ||  || Andersen || Madison Square Garden || 18,006 || 48–18–8 || 104 || 
|- style="background:#fcc;"
| 75 || April 14 || Detroit Red Wings || 0–3 ||  || Raanta || PNC Arena || 17,811 || 48–19–8 || 104 || 
|- style="background:#fcc;"
| 76 || April 16 || @ Colorado Avalanche || 4–7 ||  || Andersen || Ball Arena || 18,091 || 48–20–8 || 104 || 
|- style="background:#cfc;"
| 77 || April 18 || @ Arizona Coyotes || 5–3 ||  || Raanta || Gila River Arena || 8,496 || 49–20–8 || 106 || 
|- style="background:#cfc;"
| 78 || April 21 || Winnipeg Jets || 4–2 ||  || Raanta || PNC Arena || 17,587 || 50–20–8 || 108 || 
|- style="background:#cfc;"
| 79 || April 23 || @ New Jersey Devils || 3–2 || OT || Kochetkov || Prudential Center || 10,376 || 51–20–8 || 110 || 
|- style="background:#cfc;"
| 80 || April 24 || @ New York Islanders || 5–2 ||  || Kochetkov || UBS Arena || 15,945 || 52–20–8 || 112 || 
|- style="background:#cfc;"
| 81 || April 26 || @ New York Rangers || 4–3 ||  || Kochetkov || Madison Square Garden || 17,358 || 53–20–8 || 114 || 
|- style="background:#cfc;"
| 82 || April 28 || New Jersey Devils || 6–3 ||  || Raanta || PNC Arena || 18,040 || 54–20–8 || 116 || 
|-

|-
| 2021–22 schedule

Playoffs

Player statistics

Skaters

Goaltenders

†Denotes player spent time with another team before joining the Hurricanes. Stats reflect time with the Hurricanes only.
‡Denotes player was traded mid-season. Stats reflect time with the Hurricanes only.
Bold/italics denotes franchise record.

Transactions
The Hurricanes have been involved in the following transactions during the 2021–22 season.

Trades

Players acquired

Players lost

Signings

Draft picks

Below are the Carolina Hurricanes' selections at the 2021 NHL Entry Draft, which were held on July 23 to 24, 2021. It was held virtually via Video conference call from the NHL Network studio in Secaucus, New Jersey.

References

Carolina Hurricanes
Carolina Hurricanes seasons
Carolina Hurricanes
Carolina Hurricanes